This list of Adobe Flash animated films consists of animated feature and/or TV films produced in Adobe Animate (formerly Adobe Flash Professional, Macromedia Flash, and FutureSplash Animator). It is organized by the year of release.

Flash animated feature films

Non-Flash films that utilized Flash

See also
 Flash animation
 Anima Estudios
 Animation
 Adobe Flash
 List of Flash animated television series

References

Flash